Maxime Cressy and Fabrice Martin defeated Lloyd Glasspool and Harri Heliövaara in the final, 7–6(7–2), 6–4 to win the men's doubles tennis title at the 2023 Dubai Tennis Championships.

Tim Pütz and Michael Venus were the reigning champions, but Venus chose to compete in Acapulco instead. Pütz partnered Kevin Krawietz, but lost in the first round to Glasspool and Heliövaara.

Seeds

Draw

Draw

Qualifying

Seeds

Qualifiers
  Andrew Harris /  John-Patrick Smith

Lucky losers

Qualifying draw

References

External links
 Main draw
 Qualifying draw

Dubai Tennis Championships - Men's Doubles
Doubles men